David Thomas Van Gorder (born March 27, 1957) is a retired Major League Baseball catcher. He played during five seasons at the major league level for the Cincinnati Reds and Baltimore Orioles. He was drafted by the Reds in the second round of the 1978 amateur draft.

Currently, Dave is a manager for UPS in Las Vegas, Nevada.

Sources

Pelota Binaria (Venezuelan Winter League)

1957 births
Living people
Baltimore Orioles players
Baseball players from Los Angeles
Cardenales de Lara players
American expatriate baseball players in Venezuela
Cincinnati Reds players
Denver Zephyrs players
Indianapolis Indians players
Major League Baseball catchers
Nashville Sounds players
Rochester Red Wings players
USC Trojans baseball players
Wichita Aeros players
American expatriate baseball players in Italy
Grosseto Baseball Club players
Anchorage Glacier Pilots players